Biskupów  (German Bischofswalde) is a village in the administrative district of Gmina Głuchołazy, within Nysa County, Opole Voivodeship, in south-western Poland, close to the Czech border.

Notable residents
 Johannes Ronge (1813–1887), founder of the German Catholics
 Bernard Sannig

References

Villages in Nysa County